Walking Tall is an American television drama series that ran on NBC in 1981 for one season of seven episodes. The first 5 episodes aired Saturday nights at 9:00 p.m. (opposite the ABC series The Love Boat). The last 2 episodes aired Tuesday nights at 10:00 p.m. (opposite ABC's Hart to Hart). NBC reran all 7 episodes from April–June 1981.  This one-hour show was a continuation of the 1973 film Walking Tall, which was based on the life of McNairy County Sheriff Buford Pusser. In this series, Pusser is the sheriff of the fictionalized McNeal County, Tennessee, fighting criminals each week in 1969.

Bo Svenson played Pusser, whom he had played before in Walking Tall Part 2 (1975) and Walking Tall: Final Chapter (1977). (Brian Dennehy played Pusser in A Real American Hero in 1978 on CBS).

The rest of the cast included:
 Walter Barnes as Carl Pusser
 Harold Sylvester as Deputy Aaron Fairfax
 Courtney Pledger as Deputy Joan Litton
 Jeff Lester as Deputy Grady Spooner
 Heather McAdam as Dwanna Pusser
 Rad Daly as Michael Pusser

L.Q. Jones appeared in one segment as John Witter, Pusser's long-time nemesis.

Guest stars included Robert Englund, William Windom, Chuck Connors, Merlin Olsen, Ralph Bellamy, Gail Strickland, James MacArthur, and Art Hindle.

The theme song "Walking Tall" was sung by Brad Mercer. At the time, Svenson was the highest-paid actor in a television series.

Episodes

DVD release
Sony Pictures Home Entertainment released the entire series on DVD in Region 1 on March 7, 2006.

References

External links
 
 

1980s American drama television series
1981 American television series debuts
1981 American television series endings
NBC original programming
English-language television shows
Television series by Sony Pictures Television
Television shows set in Los Angeles
Live action television shows based on films